Spatholobus is a genus of flowering plants in the legume family Fabaceae belonging to the subfamily Faboideae.

References 

Phaseoleae
Fabaceae genera